Prača is a village in the municipalities of Pale, Republika Srpska entity, and Pale-Prača, Federation of Bosnia and Herzegovina entity, Bosnia and Herzegovina.

In the 1991 census it had a population of 1,873.

Demographics 
According to the 2013 census, its population was 435, with 304 living in the Pale-Prača part and 131 in the Republika Srpska part.

References

Populated places in Pale, Bosnia and Herzegovina
Populated places in Pale-Prača